The Golden Melody Award for Song of the Year is presented by the Ministry of Culture of Taiwan to honor outstanding vocal recording tracks in the pop music genre. The Song of the Year award is one of the most prestigious categories at the awards presented annually since the 1st Golden Melody Awards in 1990. The award was presented for additional years until being discontinued in 1997, and was then revived in 2006. It is awarded to a single or for a track from an album, and goes to the performing artist for that song.

Recipients

Category facts 
Most wins

Most nominations

References 

Golden Melody Awards